Mike Stahr (born December 9, 1964) is a former American sub-4 miler who had an extensive career in track and field.

High school career
Stahr attended Carmel High School, where he was guided by coach Paul Collins. Stahr's first high-profile victory came in the 1982 Millrose High School Mile, where he won in 4 minutes and 13 seconds  against a very talented field of All Americans and a group of runners that were later to be considered some of the Best High School Runners ever. After a victory at Millrose in 1982, Stahr came back in 1983  to defend his crown. Going into the race, Stahr talked about breaking the legendary four-minute barrier. But after a first 400 meters in 58.6 seconds, the race became tactical with Stahr and the other leaders choosing to vary the pace. Stahr held off many challenges in the last half mile and held on to win in 4:10. Stahr went on to capture four New York State Mile Championship Titles and ended his high school career with personal bests of: 400m-47 800m-1:50 1000m-2:24 1500m-3:46 Mile-4:06  2 Mile-9:01.

Collegiate career

Stahr joined Arizona State University in 1983. As a freshman, he made the finals of the NCAA indoor 1000m with the fastest qualifying time (2:23.19) but fell on the second turn. His time in the trials was faster than the NCAA winner, William Wuyke at 2:24.06. At the Sun Angel Classic he anchored the World Record 4x800 with an official split of 1:45. He was unofficially clocked at 1:44.8 by his coach Len Miller. Their 4x800 team won the Millrose indoor title as well as many other top ranking meets.  Still as a freshman, he posted a 45.8 relay split. During his sophomore year he came in 4th at the Pac-10 XC regional meet to earn him a spot on the NCAA XC team where he finished 101st. In his junior year he transferred to Georgetown University after becoming frustrated with five coaching changes at ASU. His first official year with Georgetown earned him All American in XC among other accomplishments.  In 1987 Stahr captured the NCAA Indoor Mile Championship in a time of 4:02  several weeks after his 4x800 anchor leg of 1:46.2 at the indoor BIG East meet.  During the outdoor season of '87 he anchored the World Record Distance Medley Relay, running an anchor leg split of 3:54  to carry his team to a time of 9:20.9, eclipsing the old World Record by two seconds. It still stands as the school record at Georgetown University.

Post-collegiate career
After graduating from Georgetown, Stahr went on to compete on the pro circuit. In 1988 he qualified for the Olympic Trials in the 800 and 1500 and was 4th in the US Nationals in the 800.  Biting off more than he could chew by competing in both the 800 and 1500 at the trials, Stahr raced well but was unable to qualify for the games.  In 1992 he qualified for the Trials in the 1500 but was injured two weeks prior to competition and was unable to race.  He has been inducted into 5 Athletic Hall-of-Fames: Carmel High School, Arizona State University, Georgetown University, and twice to the Penn Relays Wall-of-Fame. Once as a member of the 1987 DMR and once for his individual accomplishments at the Carnival.

Today
Stahr lives in Oxford, Ohio, with his wife and four children. He is a full-time lecturer at Miami University, and a private coach for all levels of athletes. He is the founder of the on-line running log, Running2Win.com and has started a non-profit organization, The Anna Foundation where he offers assistance to underprivileged kids in athletics. Mike also volunteers at the Penn Relays each year meeting some of the most iconic athletes in the sport.

References

[Sports Illustrated Article: 

American male sprinters
Arizona State University alumni
Georgetown University alumni
Miami University faculty
American track and field coaches
1964 births
Living people